Volume 8: The Threat Is Real is the eighth studio album by American heavy metal band Anthrax. The album was released on July 28, 1998, by Ignition Records and debuted at number 118 on the Billboard 200 chart. The record was produced by the band and Paul Crook. It features the song "Crush", which appeared in the video game ATV Offroad Fury for PlayStation 2 and in the game's soundtrack. Other released singles from the album were "Inside Out", "Piss N Vinegar" and "Born Again Idiot".

"Pieces", the hidden track at the end of the album, was written by bassist Frank Bello as a tribute to his brother Anthony who was murdered outside his girlfriend's home in the Bronx on March 25, 1996, by an unidentified assailant. The track features Bello on vocals.

Reception

Stephen Thomas Erlewine, in a mixed review for AllMusic, wrote that the album is a continuation of the band's "writing slump" which started with 1993's Sound of White Noise. He said that there aren't many "memorable songs" on the record, and went to call it "transitional album" leading the band to "new, uncharted territory". Stephen Thompson of The A.V. Club found the album to be "aggressive to the point of being exhausting". Martin Popoff in his Collector's Guide to Heavy Metal remarks how the band put a bit of everything in the songs, including multiple speeds, "humor scattered here and there", "big grungy guitars", "meat and potatoes riffing and roaring vocals from Bush", while "experimenting with some different textures and dynamics". The result is not just "an accessible thrash metal record", as is typical with Anthrax.

In his 2014 autobiography I'm the Man: The Story of that Guy from Anthrax, Scott Ian said "I'm still proud of the songs we wrote for Volume 8: The Threat is Real. They were really diverse and heavy, modern sounding with a crushing metal groove. 1998 is the year nu metal took over but we were definitely not a part of that scene. If anything we were old metal, so getting anyone to support us was proving difficult."

Track listing
All lyrics written by John Bush and Scott Ian; all music by Charlie Benante, except where noted.

Credits
Anthrax
John Bush - vocals
Scott Ian - guitars, vocals on "Cupajoe"
Frank Bello - bass, vocals on "Pieces"
Charlie Benante - drums, lead guitars on some tracks

Guests
Phil Anselmo - backing vocals on "Killing Box"
Dimebag Darrell - guitar solos on "Inside Out" and "Born Again Idiot"
Paul Crook - guitar solos on "Killing Box", "Hog Tied", "Big Fat", "Stealing from a Thief"

Production
Produced by Anthrax
Co-produced and engineered by Paul Crook
Mixed by Chris Sheldon

Charts

References

External links
 
 Review in The Fulford and Tang Hall Curmudgeon #11

Anthrax (American band) albums
1998 albums